Vesey-Fitzgerald's burrowing skink (Janetaescincus veseyfitzgeraldi) is a species of lizard in the family Scincidae. The species is endemic to the Seychelles.

Etymology
The specific epithet, veseyfitzgeraldi, commemorates the Irish ecologist Leslie Desmond Edward Foster Vesey-Fitzgerald.

Geographic range
J. veseyfitzgeraldi is found only in the Seychelles.

Habitat
The natural habitat of J. veseyfitzgeraldi is tropical moist lowland forests.

Conservation status
J. veseyfitzgeraldi is threatened by habitat loss.

References

Further reading
Greer AE (1970). "The Systematics and Evolution of the Subsaharan Africa, Seychelles, and Mauritius Scincine Scincid Lizards". Bulletin of the Museum of Comparative Zoology 140 (1): 1–23. (Janetaescincus veseyfitzgeraldi, new combination, p. 18).
Henkel F-W, Schmidt W (2000). Amphibians and Reptiles of Madagascar and the Mascarene, Seychelles, and Comoro Islands. Malabar, Florida: Krieger Publishing. 316 pp. . (Scelotes veseyfitzgeraldi).
Parker HW (1947). In: Vesey-Fitzgerald D (1947). "Reptiles and Amphibians from the Seychelles Archipelago". Annals and Magazine of Natural History, Eleventh Series 14: 577–584. (Amphiglossus veseyfitzgeraldi, new species).

Janetaescincus
Reptiles described in 1947
Endemic fauna of Seychelles
Taxa named by Hampton Wildman Parker
Taxonomy articles created by Polbot